Juan Andrés Arango García (born September 19, 1976) is a Colombian-Canadian film director. His debut feature film, La Playa DC, premiered at the 2012 Cannes Film Festival and was selected as the Colombian entry for the Best Foreign Language Film at the 86th Academy Awards.

Originally from Bogotá, Colombia, he has resided primarily in Montreal, Quebec since commencing graduate studies in film at Concordia University in 2006.

His second film, X500, debuted at the 2016 Toronto International Film Festival.

In 2019 he was one of seven directors, alongside Kaveh Nabatian, Sophie Goyette, Sophie Deraspe, Karl Lemieux, Ariane Lorrain and Caroline Monnet, of the anthology film The Seven Last Words (Les sept dernières paroles).

References

External links

Colombian film directors
People from Bogotá
Film directors from Montreal
Concordia University alumni
Colombian emigrants to Canada
Living people
1976 births